was a village located in Kanzaki District, Saga Prefecture, Japan. As of 2003, the village had an estimated population of 1,941 and a population density of 31.86 persons per km2. The total area was 60.93 km2. On March 20, 2006, Sefuri, along with the towns of Kanzaki (former) and Chiyoda (all from Kanzaki District), was merged to create the city of Kanzaki.

Dissolved municipalities of Saga Prefecture